Rona McGregor is a Canadian curler.

Teams and events

References

External links
 
Rona McGregor - Curling Canada Stats Archive

Living people
Canadian women curlers
Curlers from Alberta
Canadian women's curling champions
Year of birth missing (living people)